Cem was a weekly political satire magazine which was first published in the Ottoman Empire and then in Turkey. It was published between 1910 and 1912 and continued its publication in the period 1927–1929. The magazine was named after its founder, Cemil Cem.

History and profile
Cem was established by Cemil Cem who was a caricaturist. It was first published in November 1910. The magazine was headquartered in Istanbul and had two editions, Ottoman Turkish and French. Its subtitle was political, humoristic and satirical illustrated journal. The founding editor-in-chief was Refik Halit Karay. He also published articles in the magazine which attacked the policies of the Committee of Union and Progress. The magazine ended publication in December 1912.

Cem was restarted by Cemil Cem in 1927. The same year he was put on trial for the publication of a caricature in the magazine which folded in 1929.

References

1910 establishments in the Ottoman Empire
1912 disestablishments in the Ottoman Empire
1927 establishments in Turkey
1929 disestablishments in Turkey
Bilingual magazines
Defunct political magazines published in Turkey
French-language magazines
Magazines established in 1910
Magazines established in 1927
Magazines disestablished in 1912
Magazines disestablished in 1919
Magazines published in Istanbul
Satirical magazines published in Turkey
Turkish-language magazines
Weekly magazines published in Turkey
Turkish political satire